The basketball tournaments of NCAA Season 76 are the Philippines' National Collegiate Athletic Association tournaments for basketball in its 2000–2001 season. Mapua Institute of Technology hosted the season, starting with an opening ceremony held at the Araneta Coliseum on July 22, 2000 followed by a quadruple-header. Games then are subsequently held at Rizal Memorial Coliseum and aired by PTV-4.

Seniors' tournament

Elimination round

Team standings

Match-up results

Scores
Results on top and to the right of the dashes are for first-round games; those to the bottom and to the left of it are second-round games.

Bracket

Semifinals 
JRC and Perpetual Help have the twice-to-beat advantage. They only have to win once, while their opponents, twice, to progress.

JRC vs. San Sebastian 

Trailing 22-38 at the half of Game 1, the Heavy Bombers greeted the second half with a fierce 18-0 run to lead by two, with 11:37 to go, but the Stags' Nurjamjam Alfad and Christian Coronel conspired to defeat the Heavy Bombers and secured the win. Alfad finished with 14 points while Coronel sank the important free throws to win the game.

The Stags dominated the Heavy Bombers all throughout Game 2. Mark Macapagal pumped in 25 points, Christian Coronel had 19, and Nicole Uy contributed 15, including a one-handed slam that punctuated the Stags' dominance of the Heavy Bombers.

Perpetual vs. Benilde 

CSB Blazers' star Sunday Salvacion knocked in a triple in the dying moments of the game as the Altas' Jojo Manalo and Milo Bonifacio heaved desperate attempts and failed to capitalized as time expired, leaving the boisterous St. Benilde gallery exploding in pandemonium.

Thanks to their deeper bench, CSB Blazers upset title-favorites Perpetual Altas, thus entered the Finals for the first time since joining the NCAA in 1998.

Finals 
The San Sebastian Stags are back in the Finals two years after they were beaten by the Letran Knights who were led by Kerby Raymundo and Christian Calaguio. The CSB Blazers, on the other hand, are in their very first Finals appearance since joining the NCAA in 1998.

Finals Most Valuable Player: 

It was a nip and tuck affair and the Blazers leading most of the way of Game 1. Near the end of the game, San Sebastian took the lead for the first time, 64-61, thanks to Mark Macapagal and Paul Reguerra converting their free throws. However, Al Magpayo drew a three-point play off Macapagal to tie the game with 40 seconds remaining. Magpayo then gave an inbound pass to Mark Magsumbol then coasted on a game-winning layup to lift the Blazers past the Stags.

Duplicating their sister school's feat, the Blazers masterfully beat the Stags in Game 2 from the start, capitalized from the poor free-throw shooting of the San Sebastian squad. With their deep bench, the Blazers easily took the half, 37-25, before speeding to a 16-point margin, 54-38. The Blazers then never looked back, capturing their first title since joining the league in 1998.

Awards 

 Most Valuable Player:  
 Mythical Five:

 

 
Rookie of the Year:

References 

76
2000 in Philippine basketball